The  took place in 1923 in the aftermath of the Great Kantō earthquake. The Kameido police in Tokyo arrested labor activists, in fear that they would spread disorder. Troops of the 13th Cavalry Regiment proceeded to execute the prisoners and to dispose of the bodies. Koreans were also targeted, as it was thought they were planning to overthrow the government. Across Tokyo and Yokohama it is estimated that 6000 Koreans were murdered. Joshua Hammer, writing in the Smithsonian magazine, tells us the Kanto earthquake "accelerated Japan’s drift toward militarism and war."

Background
On September 1, 1923, the Great Kantō earthquake struck Tokyo and Yokohama and martial law was imposed in the aftermath of the earthquake. On the evening of September 3, the Kameido police in Tokyo began arresting known social activists, suspecting that they would "spread disorder or forment revolution amid the confusion". During the mass arrests, police arrested union leader Hirasawa Keishichi, and Nakatsuji Uhachi, a member of the Pure Laborers' Union. The Special Higher Police arrested seven members of the Nankatsu Labor Association. Army troops detained an eighth member of the association, Sato Kinji.

Between late at night on September 3 and September 5, troops of the 13th Cavalry Regiment on emergency duty in Kameido shot and decapitated Hirasawa and nine others. They disposed of the bodies, together with those of Korean and Chinese massacre victims, along the banks of the Arakawa drainage canal. As many as 6000 Koreans were murdered due to the suspicion, founded or not, that they would use the civil unrest of the earthquake to overthrow the Japanese government.

The police issued an official notice on October 14, claiming that troops had shot the men because they were agitating prisoners. The following year, the Liberal Lawyers' Association and union leaders worked to bring the facts to light and establish responsibility, with partial success. Police claimed to have cremated the remains of the victims. With no remains to bury, a memorial service was held in February 1924.

Victims of the Kameido Incident
Hirasawa Keishichi
Kawai Yoshitora
Kato Koju
Kitashima Kichizo
Kondo Kozo
Nakatsuji Uhachi
Sato Kinji
Suzuki Naoichi
Yamagishi Jitsuji
Yoshimura Koji

See also
Amakasu Incident

References

Further reading

1923 in Japan
1923 in military history
Mass murder in 1923
1920s in Tokyo
September 1923 events
Anarchism in Japan
Anti-anarchism
History of anarchism
Murder in Japan
Political repression in Japan
1923 murders in Japan
Massacres in Japan
1923 Great Kantō earthquake
Labour movement in Japan
Imperial Japanese Army